The Men's 100 metres T11 event for the 2000 Summer Paralympics took place at the Stadium Australia.

The T11 category is for athletes with a visual impairment. A T11 athlete may be entirely without sight, or be able to perceive light, but have no ability to see the shape of a hand at any distance. T11 athletes commonly run with guides.

Results

Round 1 
Athletes qualified for the semi-final if they won their heat or achieved one of the 4 fastest other times.

Heat 1

Heat 2

Heat 3

Heat 4

Semi-finals 
Athletes qualified for the final if they won their race, or achieved one of the next 2 fastest times.

Heat 1

Heat 2

Final

References 
 

Athletics at the 2000 Summer Paralympics